Stadionul Daniel Prodan is a multi-use stadium located in Satu Mare, Romania. It is currently used mostly for football matches and is the home ground of CSM Satu Mare. For almost all its existence, the stadium was the home ground of Olimpia Satu Mare.

The stadium holds 18,000 people, but only 1,500 on seats and it can also host athletics competitions due to the clay track that surrounds the pitch. It is the 11th stadium in the country by capacity.

The stadium was known as Stadionul Olimpia but was renamed in February 2017 as Stadionul Daniel Prodan in honor of the former international footballer Daniel Prodan.

Notes

References

Football venues in Romania
Buildings and structures in Satu Mare County
Buildings and structures in Satu Mare